is a professional Go player.

Biography 
Yamashiro grew up with Go, as he became a professional in 1972. He eventually joined the Nagoya branch of the Nihon Ki-in. He has challenged for many of Japan's biggest titles, but he has not won any of them. He became a 9 dan in 1985, after winning the Okan, but has not won any other titles.

Titles and runners-up

External links
GoBase Profile
Nihon Ki-in Profile (Japanese)

1958 births
Japanese Go players
Living people
Sportspeople from Yamaguchi Prefecture
People from Yamaguchi (city)